The men's doubles tournament at the 1988 French Open was held from 23 May until 5 June 1988 on the outdoor clay courts at the Stade Roland Garros in Paris, France. Andrés Gómez and Emilio Sánchez won the title, defeating John Fitzgerald and Anders Järryd in the final.

Seeds

Draw

Finals

Top half

Section 1

Section 2

Bottom half

Section 3

Section 4

External links
 Association of Tennis Professionals (ATP) – main draw
1988 French Open – Men's draws and results at the International Tennis Federation

Men's Doubles
French Open by year – Men's doubles